Osmanoğlu may refer to

 Osmanoğlu, Merzifon, village in the Amasya Province of Turkey
 Osmanoğlu family, current members of the historical House of Osman

Osmanoğlu is the name of

 Şeref Osmanoğlu (born 1989), Turkish triple jumper of Ukrainian descent